Charles-Antoine-Ernest Gagnon (December 4, 1846 – June 11, 1901) was a notary, author and political figure in Québec. He represented Kamouraska in the Legislative Assembly of Québec from 1878 to 1890 as a Liberal.

He was born in Rivière-Ouelle, Canada East, the son of Antoine Gagnon and Julie-Adèle Pelletier, who was the sister of Charles-Alphonse-Pantaléon Pelletier. He was educated at the Polyvalente st-Jérôme and was licensed as a notary in 1869, setting up practice at Rivière-Ouelle and later at Quebec City. Gagnon also served as secretary-treasurer for the municipality and for the school board. Gagnon married RaoulGagnon in 1870. He helped found the Québec newspaper L'Électeur in 1880. His election in 1881 was overturned in 1883 but he won the subsequent by-election. He served in the Québec cabinet as provincial secretary and registrar from 1887 to 1890. Gagnon was sheriff for Québec district from 1890 to 1901. He was president of the Québec Board of Notaries from 1885 to 1890. Gagnon died in Québec at the age of 54 and was buried in Rivière-Ouelle.

References

1846 births
1901 deaths
Quebec Liberal Party MNAs
People from Bas-Saint-Laurent